Big Nate is an American computer-animated streaming television series developed by Mitch Watson and based on the comic strip and book series of the same name by Lincoln Peirce. It follows the adventures of the titular protagonist, alongside his friends, in sixth grade. The executive producers are Mitch Watson and John Cohen. Peirce is also collaborating with the producers for the show. It premiered on Paramount+ on February 17, 2022. In March 2022, the series was renewed for a second season.

Premise 
Big Nate follows the adventures and misadventures of Nate Wright, a semi-incompetent, spirited, and rebellious sixth-grader. His friend group includes Francis, Teddy, Chad, and Dee Dee. Nate hates social studies teacher Mrs. Godfrey, whom he considers his nemesis and calls her names like "the school's Godzilla", and tends to run afoul of her, the firm Principal Nichols, and the ageing science teacher Mr. Galvin. At home, Nate lives with his single father Martin and girly older sister Ellen.

Characters 

 Nate Wright (voiced by Ben Giroux)
 Ellen Wright (voiced by Dove Cameron)
 Martin Wright (voiced by Rob Delaney)
 Teddy Ortiz (voiced by Arnie Pantoja)
 Chad Applewhite (voiced by Charlie Schlatter)
 Principal Nichols (voiced by Kevin Michael Richardson)
 Mrs. Godfrey (voiced by Carolyn Hennesy)
 Francis Pope (voiced by Daniel MK Cohen)
 Dee Dee Holloway (voiced by Bryce Charles)

Release 
The series was originally planned to premiere on Nickelodeon in September 2021. However, in December 2021, with the casting, it was announced that it would premiere on Paramount+ in early 2022, later specified as February 17. On August 3, 2022, it was announced that nine new episodes would release on Paramount+ on August 19, 2022. The series began airing on Nickelodeon on September 5, 2022.

Production 
In 1991, the first year the Big Nate comic was published, Peanuts executive producer Lee Mendelson purchased the option from Lincoln Peirce to make an animated Big Nate television series for Saturday-morning cartoons at NBC; Peirce "was paid $5,000 to write a quote-on-quote bible describing the characters and outlining a few story ideas". However, the day after this deal was finalized, all NBC Saturday-morning cartoons were cancelled, sending the series into development hell.

On February 19, 2020, Nickelodeon announced an animated Big Nate series. Nickelodeon's executive vice president of animation production and development, Ramsey Ann Naito, stated that she had wanted to adapt the Big Nate book series into an animated series for a long time.

On March 24, 2022, the series was renewed for a second season of 10 episodes. On August 3, 2022, it was announced that 10 additional episodes were ordered for the second season, with the season set to release in 2023.

Episodes

Shorts

Reception

Critical response 
Ashley Moulton from Common Sense Media gave the series three-out-of-five stars, stating "like the book series the show is based on, the TV show is likely to be loved by kids and to divide parents."

Awards and nominations

Notes

References

External links 
 
 Big Nate on Paramount+
 

American children's animated comedy television series
American computer-animated television series
2020s American animated television series
Paramount+ original programming
Nicktoons
2022 American television series debuts
Television shows based on comic strips
Animated television series about children
Animated television series about families
English-language television shows
Big Nate
Paramount+ children's programming